This is a list of Dutch television related events from 1974.

Events

Debuts

Television shows

1950s
NOS Journaal (1956–present)
Pipo de Clown (1958-1980)

Ending this year

Births
1 February - Fabienne de Vries, TV presenter, actress & singer
3 June - Tooske Ragas, actress & TV presenter
23 July - Jan Joost van Gangelen, TV presenter & sports journalist
9 November - Bridget Maasland, dancer, TV presenter & model

Deaths